Pragati Aerospace Museum (also known as "Hindustan Aeronautics Limited Pragati Museum") is situated outside the town of Nashik in India. In August 2001, HAL opened this museum to showcase their technical achievements and commendable journey. The models of air-crafts manufactured by HAL are kept here for display. The models are mounted on pylons.

Museum highlights
The aerospace museum is divided into two rooms. One room is showcasing pictorial history of HAL, including flight history, fighter plane technology, etc. And the other room contains some polished components of aircraft, mainly Sukhoi Su-30, Mig-21, and Mig-27. Also a Mig-21's pilot helmet and flight suit dating from 1963 are displayed here.

References

2001 establishments in Maharashtra
Museums established in 2001
Museums in Maharashtra
Aerospace museums in India
Buildings and structures in Nashik
Tourist attractions in Nashik
Industry museums in India